Deer Canyon is a census-designated place (CDP) in Torrance County, New Mexico, United States. It was first listed as a CDP prior to the 2020 census.

The CDP is in the southwestern part of the county, at the base of  cliffs that rise to the southeast.

Demographics

Education
Its school district is Mountainair Public Schools.

References 

Census-designated places in Torrance County, New Mexico
Census-designated places in New Mexico